Gregorio Hernández may refer to:
José Gregorio Hernández (1864–1919), Venezuelan physician
Gregorio Hernández de Alba (1904–1973), Colombian archeologist (es)
Gregorio Hernández Ríos "El Goyo" (1936–2012), Cuban rumba musician
Gregorio Hernández de Velasco (1525–1586), Spanist humanist (es)
Gregorio Cárdenas Hernández "Goyo" (1915–1999), Mexican serial killer
Gregorio Hernández (athlete), Cuban triple jumper at the 1990 Goodwill Games
Gregorio Hernández Jr., Secretary of Education (Philippines) (1954–1957)

See also
Gregorio Fernández, Spanish Baroque sculptor